In the United States Armed Forces, a major general is a two-star general officer in the United States Army, Marine Corps, Air Force, and Space Force.

A major general ranks above a brigadier general and below a lieutenant general. The pay grade of major general is O-8. It is equivalent to the rank of rear admiral in the other United States uniformed services which use naval ranks.

Major general is the highest permanent peacetime rank in the uniformed services as higher ranks are technically temporary and linked to specific positions, although virtually all officers promoted to those ranks are approved to retire at their highest earned rank.  A major general typically commands division-sized units of 10,000 to 15,000 soldiers.

The Civil Air Patrol also uses the rank of major general, which is its highest rank and is held only by its national commander.

Statutory limits
The United States Code explicitly limits the total number of general officers that may be on active duty at any given time. The total number of active duty general officers is capped at 231 for the Army, 62 for the Marine Corps, and 198 for the Air Force. Some of these slots are reserved or finitely set by statute. For example, the Deputy Judge Advocate General of the Army is a major general in the Army; the same rank is held by the Deputy Judge Advocate General of the Air Force; the Army's Chief of Engineers is also appointed as a major general and thereafter promoted to lieutenant general.

The United States Code also limits the total number of general officers that may be on the Reserve Active Status List (RASL) in the Reserve Component, which is defined in the case of general officers as the Army National Guard,  Army Reserve, Marine Corps Reserve, Air National Guard, and Air Force Reserve.

Promotion, appointment, and tour length

To be promoted to the permanent grade of major general, officers who are eligible for promotion to this rank are screened by an in-service promotion board composed of other general officers from their branch of service. This promotion board then generates a list of officers it recommends for promotion to general rank. This list is then sent to the service secretary and the Joint Chiefs of Staff for review before it can be sent to the president, through the secretary of defense for consideration. The President nominates officers to be promoted from this list with the advice of the secretary of defense, the service secretary, and if applicable, the service's chief of staff or commandant.

Retirement
Other than voluntary retirement, statute sets a number of mandates for retirement of general officers (called flag officers in the Navy and Coast Guard). All major generals must retire after five years in grade or 35 years of service, whichever is later, unless appointed for promotion or reappointed to grade to serve longer. Otherwise, all general officers must retire the month after their 64th birthday.

History

U.S. Army

The Continental Army was established on June 15, 1775, when the Continental Congress commissioned George Washington as a general and placed him in command of the Army of Observation then besieging Boston.  The rank of major general was first established two days later on June 17, 1775, when two major generals were commissioned by Congress soon followed by two more major generals being appointed on June 19.

Following the disbanding of the Continental Army at the end of 1783 only one major general, Henry Knox, remained in service until his resignation in June 1784.  The rank was revived on March 4, 1791, when Arthur St. Clair was appointed as major general in command of the U.S. Army.   St. Clair was succeeded by Major General Anthony Wayne who commanded the Army (then named the Legion of the United States) until his death on December 15, 1796.  The rank was revived on July 19, 1798, when Alexander Hamilton and Charles C. Pinckney were commissioned as major generals during the Quasi War with France. The expanded Army was demobilized on June 15, 1800, when it was reduced to only four regiments of infantry and two of artillery commanded by a brigadier general.

The rank of major general was abolished in the U.S. Army by the Act of March 16, 1802, and restored by the Act of January 11, 1812, as preparations were being made for the War of 1812. Major general has been a rank in the U.S. Army ever since.

Until the American Civil War, major general was the highest rank that could be attained by an officer in the U.S. Army, though Winfield Scott had been given the brevet rank of lieutenant general in 1855. This was a consequence of the fact that at his death George Washington was officially listed as holding the rank of lieutenant general, rather than full general, and it was regarded as improper for an officer to hold a rank equal to or superior to Washington's. To address this anomaly, Washington was posthumously promoted by Congress to the rank of General of the Armies of the United States in 1976.

The position of Major General Commanding the Army was entitled to wear three stars according to General Order No. 6 of March 13, 1861. When Ulysses S. Grant was appointed lieutenant general on March 9, 1864, and took command of the Union forces, he used the three-star insignia formerly assigned to that position.

Confederate States Army
The Confederate States Army maintained a similar rank of major general, usually associated with the command of a division, while lieutenant generals often commanded corps and full generals led armies as a general convention.

U.S. Marine Corps
There was no major general in the U.S. Marine Corps until Commandant Charles Heywood was specially promoted by Act of Congress in July 1902. From his retirement on October 3, 1903, brigadier general was again the highest rank in the Marine Corps until May 21, 1908, when the rank held by the commandant was raised to major general. It remained the highest rank in the Marine Corps until January 20, 1942, when the rank held by the commandant was raised to lieutenant general.

U.S. Air Force
Given that the United States Air Force evolved from its predecessors, the United States Army Air Service, the United States Army Air Corps (1926–1941), and the United States Army Air Forces (1941–1947), the rank of major general in the Air Force coincides with its establishment as an independent service in 1947.

U.S Space Force
The United States Space Force became independent of the U.S. Air Force on 20 December 2019 and has a similar rank structure which includes the rank of major general.

See also
 List of major generals in the United States Regular Army before July 1, 1920
 List of United States military leaders by rank
 United States Air Force officer rank insignia
 United States Army officer rank insignia
 United States Marine Corps officer rank insignia
 United States Navy officer rank insignia

References

Explanatory notes

External links 
 

Military ranks of the United States Army
Military ranks of the United States Marine Corps
Officer ranks of the United States Air Force
Officer ranks of the United States Space Force
Two-star officers